Ryan Wilson (born 18 May  1989) is a rugby union player who plays for Glasgow Warriors as a loose forward. Born in Aldershot in England, he qualifies for Scotland through his maternal grandparents. He made his debut for Scotland in 2013 and has won 50 caps.

Club career
Wilson attended  Frensham Heights School in Surrey, a private secondary school that did not field a rugby union team.  During his time at Frensham, Wilson proved to be adept at football, and played in the school's first XI for two years.

Having played mini and junior rugby at Farnham RUFC in Surrey, he spent a 'happy year' at Moseley.

Wilson joined Glasgow Warriors from Moseley in 2010. He was made captain of the club for the 2017–18 season.

Wilson was drafted to Marr in the Scottish Premiership for the 2017–18 season. He was drafted to Stirling County for the 2018–19 season.

International career
Wilson represented Scotland A, Scotland under-20 and Scotland under-19.

Wilson was involved in an incident in the tunnel before the England vs Scotland match on Saturday 24 February 2018.

Assault conviction
Wilson was convicted of assault in 2015. He punched Glasgow Hawks player Ally Maclay while dressed as Batman, leaving Maclay with a fractured eye socket. He was suspended by the Scottish Rugby Union for three months.

References

External links 

Frensham School

1989 births
Living people
Glasgow Warriors players
Marr RFC players
People educated at Frensham Heights School
Rugby union number eights
Rugby union players from Aldershot
Scotland 'A' international rugby union players
Scotland international rugby union players
Scottish rugby union players
Stirling County RFC players